More Fuel For the Fire is an EP released by American indie-rock band Deer Tick.  It was released between their second album Born on Flag Day and their third album The Black Dirt Sessions. More Fuel For the Fire was released on Partisan Records.

Track listing

References

External links
 Official Website
 Deer Tick @ Partisan Records
 MySpace

2010 albums
Deer Tick (band) EPs
Partisan Records albums